Harold William Hanson (November 18, 1895 – October 10, 1973) was a professional football player and head coach in the National Football League (NFL). In 1921  Hanson was a player for the Rock Island Independents. In 1923 he played for the Minneapolis Marines. By 1932 he served as the head coach of the Staten Island Stapletons. Hal also played at the collegiate level while attending the University of South Dakota.

References

1895 births
1973 deaths
American football centers
American football guards
American football tackles
Minneapolis Marines players
Rock Island Independents players
South Dakota Coyotes football players
Staten Island Stapletons players
Sportspeople from La Crosse, Wisconsin
Players of American football from Wisconsin